Naomi Gurian (born 1 March 1933) is a retired California lawyer and former executive director of the Writers Guild of America, west.

Born in New York City, her parents Elias Jerome and Ethel (Lipman) Gurian moved to Los Angeles and she got her bachelor's degree from UCLA in 1955.  After working as a legal assistant for some years, she graduated from San Fernando Valley College of Law in 1976.  That same year she passed the California bar and went to work as an associate attorney at the Writers Guild of America.  In 1978 she became the assistant executive director, and in 1982 became the executive director, a position she held until 1990 when she returned to the practice of law. In 2000 she closed her legal practice, and took inactive status in the State Bar effective 1 January 2001.

Gurian married twice, and had three children by her first husband. In 2006 she and her collaborator, Irma Kalish, published their first mystery novel As Dead As It Gets under the pseudonym Cady Kalian. It was followed by A Few Good Murders in 2007.

Notes

External links 
 Young, Karen (2006) "Hollywood vets Irma Kalish and Naomi Gurian on getting their groove back, in novel form" Encino Sun 1(19): p.1,6

21st-century American novelists
American women lawyers
American mystery writers
American women novelists
California lawyers
1933 births
Living people
Women mystery writers
21st-century American women writers
21st-century pseudonymous writers
Pseudonymous women writers